Dymaea or Dymaia was a town of ancient Elis, located near the Arcadian border, and near Buprasium and Cicysium. It is unlocated.

References

Populated places in ancient Elis
Former populated places in Greece
Lost ancient cities and towns